The Moscow International University was established in 1991 by Mikhail Gorbachev and George H. W. Bush, and is the first private university in Russia.

In August 1991, President of the USSR Mikhail Gorbachev and President of the U.S. George H. W. Bush launched a joint educational project: a Soviet-American University, which in documents signed later by Boris Yeltsin, the first President of Russia, was named the Moscow International University.

The university's main campus is located at 17 Leningradsky Prospect in central Moscow.

Faculties 
The institute has following faculties:
Faculty of Management
Faculty of Major Cities
Faculty of Entrepreneurship in Culture
Faculty of Foreign Languages
Faculty of Law
Faculty of Journalism

Partners 
Washington & Jefferson College (Pennsylvania, United States)
North Park University (Chicago, United States)
University of Mississippi (Mississippi, United States)
University of Western Ontario (Canada)
Akita International University (Japan)
Institute of administration and management at the Higher school of Commerce (Paris/Nice, France)
University of León (León, Spain)
Zagreb School of Economics and Management (Zagreb, Croatia)

Honorary doctors 
Paul Davenport - the ninth President and Vice-Chancellor of the University of Western Ontario (Canada)
Mikhail Gorbachev - President of the Soviet Union
Daisaku Ikeda - President of Soka Gakkai (Japan)
Kim Hak-Su - Under Secretary of the United Nations Executive Secretary of ESCAP
Kreg Kohan - first General Director of "Coca-Cola Refreshments Moscow"
Hermenegildo Lypez Gonzalez - Professor of the University of León (Spain)
Yuri Luzhkov - the second Mayor of Moscow
Dennis Meadows - Director of the Institute of Politics and Social Research at University of New Hampshire (United States)
Victor Meskill - President of Dowling College (United States)
Kalman Mizhei - UN Development Programme, Regional Bureau for Europe and the CIS, Director
Timothy O'Connor - Vice-President of American Councils for International Education; The University of Northern Iowa
Vyacheslav Trushin - Art director of Chamber Orchestra "Rossijskaya Kamerata"
Klaus-Heinrich Standke - President of "East-West" Economic Academy (Germany)
Joan Wheeler - John Davis Foundation (United States), Trustee

References

External links
  

Universities in Moscow